Rugby union in Madagascar is a popular team sport. As of September 2018, Madagascar is ranked 50th worldwide by World Rugby (WR), and boasts over 22,540 registered players and more than 410 rugby clubs. Although Madagascar lacks a professional competition, as it is one of the poorest countries in the world, it does possess a national club competition that is extensively covered in the national print media, as well as having matches televised. 
Rugby is considered the national sport of Madagascar.

The governing body is the Madagascan Rugby Federation or Fédération Malagasy de Rugby.

History

Rugby union was introduced to Madagascar in the 1890s by French railroad workers who played the game in the capital, Antananarivo, during the colonial period. Historically the sport was seen as a violent pastime of the poor, however recent developments have seen a huge increase in the sport's profile throughout the country. The Madagascar team, locally referred to as the Makis (a Malagasy word for the ring-tailed lemur), reached the finals of the 2005 Africa Cup, increasing nationwide interest in the sport.  Since then they have been semi-finalists in the 2006 Africa Cup and finalists again in the 2007 Africa Cup.

Madagascar is a founder member of the Confederation of African Rugby (CAR), which was launched officially in January 1986, in Tunis, Tunisia. Rugby officials from Tunisia, Morocco, Senegal, Ivory Coast, Tanzania, Kenya, and the Seychelles also attended.

Competitions
The national club competition is structured along the same lines as the Argentine club championship.  The regional unions within Madagascar send their top club(s) from the previous year's championship to compete in the nationwide top-flight league called the Top 8.

The national team also competes annually in the Africa Cup, where matches sometimes double as Confederation of African Rugby Rugby World Cup qualifiers.

Popularity
In addition to large participant numbers, rugby is popular with spectators in Madagascar. The Top 8 has average attendance figures of over 8,000, whilst the league final, and most international fixtures, attract crowds upward of 30,000 at the Stade Municipal de Mahamasina in the capital. It is common that international rugby matches substantially outdraw those of football at the Mahamasina. Rugby's popularity is strongest in the central highlands region including Antananarivo.

Rugby union's popularity in the country was recently demonstrated during the Division 1B Final of the Africa Cup, held in Madagascar.  Madagascar triumphed over Namibia in front of 40,000 fans to stay in the qualification process for the 2015 Rugby World Cup to be held in the United Kingdom.

In Madagascar, rugby is a very popular sport among women. It is estimated that 60% of players in the country are women. The girls from Sapphire Coast and their captain Marcelia, backed by the French NGO Terres en Mêlées are emerging as models for the development of women rugby in poor areas outside the capital city. They actually won twice the national girls championship. 
Rugby is thus becoming a real tool to fight against poverty and develop gender equality in the country. Marcelia has been nominated one of the five most influential women of the country in 2019 by promoting development through rugby in Madagascar and in France.

See also
 Madagascar national rugby union team
 Madagascar national rugby sevens team
 Madagascar women's national rugby sevens team
 Africa Cup
 Confederation of African Rugby

External links
Indian Ocean Rugby; Madagascar
BBC News
 WR Madagascar page 
 Archives du Rugby: Madagascar

References

 
Sport in Madagascar